The 1955–56 İstanbul Football League season was the 46th season of the league. Galatasaray SK won the league for the 14th time, and qualified for the 1956–57 European Cup.

Season

References

Istanbul Football League seasons
Turkey
1955–56 in Turkish football